The Richard Cluever House is a historic house at 601 1st Avenue in Maywood, Illinois. Built in 1913–14, the house was designed by noted Prairie School architect John S. Van Bergen. Van Bergen worked for Frank Lloyd Wright before starting his own practice, and like many of his early designs, the Cluever House closely resembles Wright's work. The house features many verandas and balconies and rows of casement windows, providing views of the nearby Des Plaines River. Landscape architect Jens Jensen designed the house's surroundings, which include a garden between the house and the river.

The house was added to the National Register of Historic Places on November 17, 1977.

References

External links

Houses on the National Register of Historic Places in Cook County, Illinois
Prairie School architecture in Illinois
Houses completed in 1914
Maywood, Illinois